Alison "Ali" Nullmeyer (born 21 August 1998) is a Canadian World Cup alpine ski racer and specializes in slalom. At the age of 18 months, Nullmeyer started skiing with her family, racing competitively at age 9. Since then, she has skied with the Georgian Peaks Club in Collingwood, Ontario, and joined the Canadian Alpine Ski Team in 2015.  In 2016, Nullmeyer represented Canada in the Lillehammer Winter Youth Olympic Games, where she won silver in slalom. 

Nullmeyer made her World Championship debut in 2017 at St. Moritz. While training for the World Cup opener in October 2017, she fell, tearing her right and left ACLs, as well as suffering from a torn left lateral meniscus. After missing a season and a half, she returned to competing in January 2019, and made her World Cup debut that March.

In January 2022, Nullmeyer was named to Canada's 2022 Olympic team.

World Cup results

Season standings

Top ten finishes
 0 podiums
 3 top tens (3 SL)

World Championship results

Olympic results

References

External links
 
 

1998 births
Living people
Canadian female alpine skiers
Alpine skiers at the 2016 Winter Youth Olympics
Youth Olympic silver medalists for Canada
Alpine skiers at the 2022 Winter Olympics
Olympic alpine skiers of Canada
Skiers from Toronto